Arjun Mutreja (born 3 May 1990) is an Indian-born Singaporean cricketer. He played in the 2014 ICC World Cricket League Division Three tournament and was the highest scoring batsman for the tournament.

In August 2018, he was named in Singapore's squad for the 2018 Asia Cup Qualifier tournament. In October 2018, he was named in Singapore's squad in the Eastern sub-region group for the 2018–19 ICC World Twenty20 Asia Qualifier tournament. Later the same month, he was named in Singapore's squad for the 2018 ICC World Cricket League Division Three tournament in Oman.

In September 2019, he was named in Singapore's squad for the 2019 Malaysia Cricket World Cup Challenge League A tournament. He made his List A debut for Singapore, against Qatar, in the Cricket World Cup Challenge League A tournament on 17 September 2019. He made his Twenty20 International (T20I) debut on 2 July 2022, for Singapore against Papua New Guinea.

References

External links
 

1990 births
Living people
Singaporean cricketers
Singapore Twenty20 International cricketers
People from Alwar
Cricketers from Rajasthan
Indian emigrants to Singapore
Singaporean sportspeople of Indian descent